George McLaren is a former association footballer who represented New Zealand at international level.

McLaren played three official A-international matches for New Zealand in 1958, the first a 2–2 draw with trans-Tasman neighbours Australia on 23 August 1958. His other two matches were consecutive 2-1 wins over New Caledonia  on 31 August and 7 September respectively, McLaren scoring in the first of those games.

References 

Year of birth missing (living people)
Living people
New Zealand association footballers
New Zealand international footballers
Association footballers not categorized by position